Patiya Government College (Bengali: পটিয়া সরকারি কলেজ) is a leading and traditional educational institution in South Chittagong. It is located at Zero Point in Patiya Upazila of Chittagong District. This college is affiliated to Bangladesh National University.

Location  
The college is located near Patiya police station in Chittagong District.

History 

The college is located on 2.5 acres of land adjacent to Arakan Road at Zero Point in Patiya Upazila. The official journey of Patia College started in 1962 with the help of eminent scholars of Patiya and Anwara police stations centered on the campus of Patia Adarsh High School.

The foundation stone of the college was laid on a 2.5 acre land donated by Patia Adarsh High School in 1963 and in the first week of August, Dr. Ataul Hakim officially inaugurated the college class. The foundation stone of the science building of the college was laid on 23 July 1967. This college played an important role in the great war of independence of 1971. Till 1971, with the sincere cooperation of Babu Shantimoy Khastgir and Mr. Hamidur Rahman, another 4.8 acres of land was acquired and the size of the college increased. The nationalization of Patiya College was announced in 1978 and the college was nationalized on 1 March 1980.

Infrastructure 

Inside the college is a huge pond.

Departments
In addition to the degree pass courses, there are currently 11 honors courses in Management, Accounting, Mathematics, Physics, Chemistry, Economics, Political Science, Islamic History and Culture, Philosophy, Bengali and English.

Recently, Masters course in Management and Accounting has been introduced.

College Building 
At present, the college has two large three-storied buildings for 5,000 students in higher secondary, degree and honors classes, one with 16 classrooms including a science lab and the other with nine classrooms. There is also a two-storey administrative building with a library and 6 rooms and a separate common room for students.

 Administrative building 
Academic building 
Science building
 Humanities and business education building
 Library building
 Central Mosque

Library 
The number of books in the two-room Patiya Government College Library is about 72.

Other Fcilities 
 Mosque 
 Separate auditorium for male and female students.

References 

Colleges in Chittagong